Rhombodera rennellana is a species of praying mantises in the family Mantidae, found in the Solomon Islands.

See also
List of mantis genera and species

References

Rhombodera
Mantodea of Asia
Insects described in 1968